In mathematics, an LF-space, also written (LF)-space, is a topological vector space (TVS) X that is a locally convex inductive limit of a countable inductive system  of Fréchet spaces.  
This means that X is a direct limit of a direct system  in the category of locally convex topological vector spaces and each  is a Fréchet space. The name LF stands for Limit of Fréchet spaces.

If each of the bonding maps  is an embedding of TVSs then the LF-space is called a strict LF-space.
Some authors (e.g. Schaefer) define the term "LF-space" to mean "strict LF-space," so when reading mathematical literature, it is recommended to always check how LF-space is defined.

 Definition 

 Inductive/final/direct limit topology 

Throughout, it is assumed that 
  is either the category of topological spaces or some subcategory of the category of topological vector spaces (TVSs); 
 If all objects in the category have an algebraic structure, then all morphisms are assumed to be homomorphisms for that algebraic structure. 
  is a non-empty directed set;
  is a family of objects in  where  is a topological space for every index ;
 To avoid potential confusion,  should not be called 's "initial topology" since the term "initial topology" already has a well-known definition.
  is a set (and if objects in  also have algebraic structures, then  is automatically assumed to have has whatever algebraic structure is needed); 
  is a family of maps where for each index , the map has prototype  . If all objects in the category have an algebraic structure, then these maps are also assumed to be homomorphisms for that algebraic structure. 

However, the final topology may not exist in the category of Hausdorff topological spaces due to the requirement that  belong to the original category (i.e. belong to the category of Hausdorff topological spaces).

Direct systems 

Suppose that  is a directed set and that for all indices  there are (continuous) morphisms in 

where this means that the composition 

If the above conditions are satisfied then the triple formed by the collections of these objects, morphisms, and the indexing set 

Since the indexing set  is a directed set, the direct system is said to be directed. 
The maps  are called the bonding, connecting, or linking maps of the system. 

If the indexing set  is understood then  is often omitted from the above tuple (i.e. not written); the same is true for the bonding maps if they are understood. Consequently, one often sees written " is a direct system" where "" actually represents a triple with the bonding maps and indexing set either defined elsewhere (e.g. canonical bonding maps, such as natural inclusions) or else the bonding maps are merely assumed to exist but there is no need to assign symbols to them (e.g. the bonding maps are not needed to state a theorem).

Direct limit of a direct system 

For the construction of a direct limit of a general inductive system, please see the article: direct limit. 

Direct limits of injective systems

If each of the bonding maps  is injective then the system is called injective. 

That is, 

This sum is independent of the index  that is chosen. 

Direct limits in Top

Direct limits of directed direct systems always exist in the categories of sets, topological spaces, groups, and locally convex TVSs.  
In the category of topological spaces, if every bonding map  is/is a injective (resp. surjective, bijective, homeomorphism, topological embedding, quotient map) then so is every .

Problem with direct limits 

Direct limits in the categories of topological spaces, topological vector spaces (TVSs), and Hausdorff locally convex TVSs are "poorly behaved". 
For instance, the direct limit of a sequence (i.e. indexed by the natural numbers) of locally convex nuclear Fréchet spaces  may  to be Hausdorff (in which case the direct limit does not exist in the category of Hausdorff TVSs). 
For this reason, only certain "well-behaved" direct systems are usually studied in functional analysis. Such systems include LF-spaces. 
However, non-Hausdorff locally convex inductive limits do occur in natural questions of analysis.

Strict inductive limit 

Properties 

An inductive limit in the category of locally convex TVSs of a family of bornological (resp. barrelled, quasi-barrelled) spaces has this same property.

LF-spaces 

Every LF-space is a meager subset of itself.
The strict inductive limit of a sequence of complete locally convex spaces (such as Fréchet spaces) is necessarily complete. 
In particular, every LF-space is complete. 
Every LF-space is barrelled and bornological, which together with completeness implies that every LF-space is ultrabornological. 
An LF-space that is the inductive limit of a countable sequence of separable spaces is separable. 
LF spaces are distinguished and their strong duals are bornological and barrelled (a result due to Alexander Grothendieck).

A linear map from an LF-space into another TVS is continuous if and only if it is sequentially continuous. 
Every bounded linear operator from an LF-space into another TVS is continuous.

Thus the strong dual space of an LF-space is a Fréchet space if and only if it is an LB-space.

Examples

Space of smooth compactly supported functions 

Such a sequence could be the balls of radius i centered at the origin. The LF-space topology does not depend on the particular sequence of compact sets .

With this LF-space structure,  is known as the space of test functions, of fundamental importance in the theory of distributions.

Direct limit of finite-dimensional spaces 

Since any TVS topology on  makes continuous the inclusions of the Xm's into  , the latter space has the maximum among all TVS topologies on an -vector space with countable Hamel dimension. Also, the TVS inductive limit topology of  coincides with the topological inductive limit; that is, the direct limit of the finite dimensional spaces  in the category TOP and in the category TVS coincide. In fact, it is the unique  LC topology on  whose topological dual space is X.   

See also 

 DF-space
 Direct limit
 Final topology
 F-space
 LB-space

Citations

Bibliography 

  
  
  
  
  
  
  
  
  
  
  
  
  
  
  
  
  
  
  
  

Topological vector spaces